Arnoldus Bloemers (1792–1844) was a Dutch painter, who painted flowers, fruit, and animals.

Bloemers was born in Amsterdam.  He was instructed by Antonie Piera, but principally imitated Van Huijsum. He died at the Hague in 1844. The Rotterdam Gallery has a flower-piece by him. He died at the age of 52 at The Hague.

References

1792 births
1844 deaths
Painters from Amsterdam
19th-century Dutch painters
Dutch male painters
Flower artists
19th-century Dutch male artists